Samuel or Sam Richards may refer to:

Samuel Richards (captain), American Revolutionary war captain in the 1st New Hampshire regiment
Samuel W. Richards (1824–1909), religious and political leader in Utah
Samuel Richards (swimmer), long-distance swimmer
Samuel Richards (priest) (born 1955), Dean of Trinidad
Sam Richards (writer) (born 1949), English writer, composer and musician
Sam Richards (sociologist) (born 1960), American sociologist 
Samuel Richards (serial killer) (born 1856), a name attributed to Nebraska serial killer Stephen Dee Richards

See also
Samuel Richards Hotel, in the Mays Landing section of Hamilton Township, New Jersey
Samantha Richards (born 1983), Australian basketball player